
Skierniewice County is a unit of territorial administration and local government (powiat) in Łódź Voivodeship, central Poland. It came into being on January 1, 1999, as a result of the Polish local government reforms passed in 1998. Its administrative seat is the city of Skierniewice, although the city is not part of the county (it constitutes a separate city county); there are no towns within the county.

As of 2006 its total population is 37,779.

Neighbouring counties
Apart from the city of Skierniewice, Skierniewice County is also bordered by Sochaczew County to the north, Żyrardów County to the east, Rawa County and Tomaszów Mazowiecki County to the south, Brzeziny County to the west, and Łowicz County to the north-west.

Administrative division
The county is subdivided into nine gminas. These are listed in the following table, in descending order of population.

References
Polish official population figures 2006

 
Skierniewice